Yuezhou or Yue Prefecture was a zhou (prefecture) in imperial China in modern Zhejiang, China, centering on modern Shaoxing. It existed (intermittently) from 605 until 1131, when it became Shaoxing Prefecture.

Counties
Yue Prefecture administered the following counties (縣) through history:

References

 
 
 

605 establishments
7th-century establishments in China
1131 disestablishments in Asia
12th-century disestablishments in China
Prefectures of the Tang dynasty
Prefectures of the Sui dynasty
Prefectures of Wuyue
Liangzhe East Circuit
Shaoxing
Former prefectures in Zhejiang